Mike Stone (born June 28, 1986) is a professional lacrosse player for the Boston Cannons of the MLL. He was a star midfielder at Middlebury College and was selected in the 9th round of the 2010 MLL Supplemental Draft by the Cannons. He is a two-time MLL All-Star (2012, 2013) and a one-time MLL Champion (2011).

References

1986 births
Living people
Major League Lacrosse players
Middlebury Panthers athletes
People from Wellesley, Massachusetts
Sportspeople from Norfolk County, Massachusetts